Mitchell Terry Stanley (born 17 March 2001) is an English cricketer who plays for Worcestershire.

In November 2019, at the age of eighteen Stanley signed his first professional contract for Worcestershire, having previously represented the county's Second XI and Shropshire age group sides, after being spotted at a fast bowling programme. He extended his contract in December 2020, before signing his first full-time professional contract in September 2021, despite a side injury restricting him to eleven Second XI fixtures in 2021, with Alan Richardson describing him as a first team player for the future.

Stanley made his Worcestershire debut against Leicestershire County Cricket Club in the 2022 T20 Blast on 17 June 2022, taking a wicket on debut. He featured in a further six games for Worcestershire in the 2022 T20 Blast season, finishing with best figures of 2/24 against Birmingham where he took two wickets in the first two legitimate deliveries of the match. His performances in the tournament earned praise from overseas player and stand-in captain Colin Munro.

In August 2022, Stanley earned a call-up to the Manchester Originals side for the 2022 season of The Hundred as a replacement player for Daniel Worrall.

References

External links
 

2001 births
Living people
English cricketers
Shropshire cricketers
Worcestershire cricketers
People from Telford
Manchester Originals cricketers